Lady Emily Eliza Steele Gordon Cathcart (née Pringle) was born in 1845. Her father was John Robert Pringle. Her first marriage was to Captain John Gordon in 1865. The natural son of Colonel John Gordon "the richest commoner in the northern kingdom" he had inherited his father's extensive assets, valued at £2-3 million in 1858, on the lower estimate . The estate included Cluny Castle, North and South Uist, Benbecula and Barra.

When Captain Gordon died without legitimate issue in 1878, Emily Gordon inherited the estates. Her second husband was Sir Reginald Archibald Edward Cathcart (d. 1916) whom she married in late 1880 at St George's Hanover Square, London. He was the sixth baronet of Cathcart, succeeding to the title in 1878. The Cathcart family seat was Killochan Castle near Girvan in Ayrshire but the couple lived mainly in Titness Park, Sunninghill, Berkshire.

Known for her anti-Catholicism, she played a leading role in the Highland Clearances as she continued the mass evictions initiated by her father-in-law. Many evicted crofters on her lands were forcibly re-settled in Regina and Wapella, in Saskatchewan, Canada, possibly due to the shares she held in the Canadian Pacific Railway.

In 1891 Lady Cathcart commissioned Old Tom Morris to design a golf course at Askernish on South Uist. She included a clause in the crofters tenancy agreements retaining the right to allow golf to be played on the land.

Lady Cathcart never lived in the highlands and is thought to have visited only once; she took ten Vatersay crofters to court in 1908 after they refused to vacate their cottages. They were sentenced to serve two months imprisonment but released two weeks early.

She died on 8 August 1932 at Margate in Kent. Her will included instructions for a Long Island, United States emigration fund to be set up but this was never undertaken as the trustees refused to carry it out for fear of repercussions.

References
Citations

Bibliography

1845 births
1932 deaths